Psammochloa is a plant genus in the grass family. The only known species is Psammochloa villosa.

Distribution
Psammochloa villosa is native to Mongolia and China (Gansu, Inner Mongolia, Ningxia, Qinghai, Shaanxi, Xinjiang). It spreads by rhizomes.

References

Pooideae
Grasses of Asia
Grasses of China
Monotypic Poaceae genera
Flora of Mongolia
Flora of North-Central China
Flora of Inner Mongolia
Flora of Ningxia
Flora of Qinghai
Flora of Xinjiang
Taxa named by A. S. Hitchcock